Montbrun is the name or part of the name of the following communes in France:

 Montbrun, Lot, in the Lot department
 Montbrun, Lozère, in the Lozère department
 Montbrun-Bocage, in the Haute-Garonne department
 Montbrun-des-Corbières, in the Aude department
 Montbrun-Lauragais, in the Haute-Garonne department
 Montbrun-les-Bains, in the Drôme department
 Saint-Léger-de-Montbrun, in the Deux-Sèvres department